Atelopus nanay is a species of toads in the family Bufonidae.

It is endemic to Ecuador.
Its natural habitats are subtropical or tropical high-altitude grassland, rivers, freshwater marshes, and freshwater springs.
It is threatened by habitat loss.

References

nanay
Endemic fauna of Ecuador
Amphibians of Ecuador
Amphibians of the Andes
Amphibians described in 2002
Taxonomy articles created by Polbot